In organoiron chemistry, a ferrole is a type of diiron complex containing the (OC)3FeC4R4 heterocycle that is pi-bonded to a Fe(CO)3 group.  These compounds have Fe-Fe bonds (ca. 252 pm) and semi-bridging CO ligands (Fe-C distances = 178, 251 pm).  They are typically air-stable, soluble in nonpolar solvents, and red-orange in color.

Synthesis
Ferroles typically arise by the reaction of alkynes with iron carbonyls.  Such reactions are known to generate many products, e.g. complexes of cyclopentadienones and para-quinones.

Another route involves the desulfurization of thiophenes (SC4R4) by iron carbonyls, shown in the following idealized equation:
Fe3(CO)12  +  SC4R4  →  Fe2(CO)6C4R4  +  FeS  + 6CO

An unusual route to ferroles involves treatment of Collman's reagent with trimethylsilyl chloride (tms =  (CH3)3Si):
2Na2Fe(CO)4  +  4tmsCl  →  Fe2(CO)6C4(Otms)4  +  2CO  +  4NaCl

Reactions
Some ferroles  react with tertiary phosphines to give the substituted flyover complex Fe2(CO)5(PR3)(C4R4CO).

References

Organoiron compounds
Carbonyl complexes
Trimethylsilyl compounds